Vakiti Sunitha Laxma Reddy  was elected as Congress Party MLA from Narsapur Assembly Constituency, Medak District of Telangana. She was elected for three terms from the same constituency. She served as Minister for Minor Irrigation in the cabinets led by Dr. Y.S. Raja Sekhar Reddy and K. Rosaiah. In the recent reshuffling and reformation of the cabinet by N. Kiran Kumar Reddy, Sunitha Laxma Reddy was allocated the portfolio of Indira Kranthi Yojana and Pensions.

On 3 April 2019, she joined TRS Party at the public meeting in Medak parliamentary constituency.

Present:
Telangana government appointed Vakiti Sunitha Lakshma Reddy as the chairperson and the members of women's commission on 27th Dec.

Sunitha was also the former minister of women development and child welfare in Andhra Pradesh who has now taken the charge of being the Chairperson of the women's commission.

References
 
 

1968 births
Living people
Indian National Congress politicians from Telangana
Women in Telangana politics
Telangana politicians
21st-century Indian women politicians
21st-century Indian politicians